Jessica Napier (born 13 April 1979) is a New Zealand-born actress based in Australia. She has appeared in a number of feature films, including Love Serenade, Blackrock, Cut, City Loop, Angst, The Illustrated Family Doctor and Ghost Rider, and is well known for her role of Becky Howard in the Australian TV drama series McLeod's Daughters.

Early life
Napier was born in Wellington, New Zealand. Her father, actor Marshall Napier, relocated the family to Australia when she was a child.

Career
Napier had her first acting role at age 9, when she played her father's daughter on the long-running Australian TV series Police Rescue. A year later she reappeared in another episode, when her father nominated her to fill in for a role when the girl who was booked for the job refused as the character was required to be submerged in a swamp.

It was not until Napier was 15 that she decided to be an actress. On her first serious audition she won the lead role of Edwina on Echo Point. Her first feature film was in Shirley Barrett's award-winning Love Serenade (with Miranda Otto), followed by the critically acclaimed Blackrock, where her character's brother was played by Heath Ledger in his first prominent film role.

Small parts in a string of other popular Australian TV shows, including Water Rats and Murder Call, followed; she played the role of Gerry Davis in the highly acclaimed Wildside, alongside Aaron Pedersen, Rachel Blake and Tony Martin. 

Napier then appeared in Stingers (with Peter Phelps) and City Loop before landing the lead role of Raffy in Mushroom Pictures' film Cut. The cult Australian slasher film was her first lead in a feature. The cast included Molly Ringwald, Kylie Minogue and Stephen Curry.

She then starred in Angst and appeared in the made-for-TV film Child Star: The Shirley Temple Story.

Already a household name in Australia, Napier then played Becky Howard on the Australian TV drama McLeod's Daughters from 2000–2003. Her father played Harry Ryan on the same series.

She then starred in the tele-movie The Alice. Following its success it went on as a series with Napier reprising her role in the tele-drama.

In 2009, Napier guest starred in both the popular third season of TV series Sea Patrol and the new Rescue: Special Ops.

The thriller Savages Crossing was released in 2010 and saw Napier star in an ensemble cast of other Australian favourites including John Jarratt, Craig McLachlan, Sacha Horler and Chris Haywood.

In 2010 the Nine Network announced that they would be continuing with their successful Underbelly franchise by producing three separate stand-alone crime telemovies which would be known as The Underbelly Files. Napier was cast as the lead actress in the second of these telemovies, titled Underbelly Files: Infiltration, opposite Sullivan Stapleton. Infiltration follows Victorian police officer Colin McClaren's investigation into the local Calabrian mafia in which he infiltrates their group. It also stars Valentino del Toro, Henry Nixon, Tottie Goldsmith, Buddy Dannoun and Glenda Linscott. In 2021 Napier appeared in a small role in Moon Rock For Monday, an AACTA nominated feature film directed by Kurt Martin.

Personal life
Napier is married to David Adler. They have a daughter and a son. Jessica Napier is a vegetarian as was her father Marshall. She supports various animal rights foundations. Napier has also supported the use of Taronga Zoo in Sydney for retired circus elephants.

Filmography

Film

Television

References

External links 

1979 births
New Zealand emigrants to Australia
Australian television actresses
Living people
New Zealand television actresses